The Hype Bros was an American professional wrestling tag team which performed in WWE on its SmackDown brand. The team, composed of Zack Ryder and Mojo Rawley, was formed in June 2015 on the development territory, NXT.

History

NXT (2015–2016)
In June 2015, Zack Ryder debuted in NXT, forming an alliance with Mojo Rawley, dubbing the Hype Bros. On the October 16 episode of NXT, The Hype Bros competed in a match for the NXT Tag Team Championship in a losing effort.

SmackDown (2016–2017)
In the WWE Draft on 19 July 2016, Rawley was drafted to SmackDown. At Battleground, Rawley saved Ryder from a post-match beating by WWE United States Champion Rusev, officially uniting the Hype Bros on the main roster. The Hype Bros entered the WWE SmackDown Tag Team Championship tournament, defeating The Vaudevillains in the first round before losing to Heath Slater and Rhyno in the semi-finals. On the October 25 episode of SmackDown, The Hype Bros defeated The Ascension to qualify as part of Team SmackDown for the 10–on–10 Survivor Series Tag Team Elimination match at Survivor Series in a losing effort. The Hype Bros were eliminated earlier within 5 minutes when Ryder was pinned following a Magic Killer from Gallows and Anderson.

On the December 13 episode of SmackDown, The Hype Bros competed in a tag-team battle royal to determine the #1 contenders for the WWE SmackDown Tag Team Championship. Despite Rawley being eliminated, Ryder would go on to win the battle royal for his team and become the #1 contenders. However, during the match, Ryder injured his knee and was seen using crutches backstage. It was later reported that Ryder would be out of action for 4–9 months. 

After six months of inactivity, Ryder returned on the June 13 episode of SmackDown, reuniting with Rawley. The Hype Bros would have an opportunity to become number one contenders for the SmackDown Tag Team championship at the June 27 episode of SmackDown in a match against champions The Usos, in which they were defeated.

Throughout the next few weeks on SmackDown, Ryder and Rawley would shown signs of dissension as Rawley would constantly tag himself into matches, which ultimately caused them to lose when they began arguing. On the October 10 episode of SmackDown, The Hype Bros faced Benjamin and Gable, Breezango (Tyler Breeze and Fandango), and The Ascension (Konnor and Viktor) in a fatal four-way match to determine the number one contenders for The Usos' SmackDown Tag Team Championship, in which The Hype Bros were unable to win.

On the November 28 episode of SmackDown, after losing a tag team match to The Bludgeon Brothers, Rawley attacked Ryder, thus turning heel and disbanding The Hype Bros. They faced each other on Clash of Champions pre-show, with Rawley coming out victorious. The two then faced each other in the United States championship tournament with Rawley being victorious.

References 

WWE teams and stables
WWE NXT teams and stables